Alexander Alekhine (1892–1946) is a Russian-French chess master and former world champion.

Alekhine may also refer to:
 Alekhine's Defence, a chess opening introduced by Alexander Alekhine
 Alekhine's gun, a chess formation named after Alexander Alekhine
 Alekhine Memorial, a 2013 chess tournament honoring Alexander Alekhine

People with the surname
 Alexei Alekhine (1888–1939), Russian chess master and brother of Alexander
 Grace Alekhine (1876–1956), American-British-French artist, chess player, and wife of Alexander Alekhine

See also
 Alekhin (disambiguation)
 Alyokhin (surname)